Laporta or LaPorta or La Porta is a place name or surname, and may refer to:

La Porta, French commune on the island of Corsica
Alphonse F. La Porta (born 1939), former US Ambassador to Mongolia
Elizza La Porta (1902-1997), Romanian born film actress
Francesco Laporta (born 1990), Italian professional golfer
Frans Laporta (1907–2002), Belgian architect
Horace François Bastien Sébastiani de La Porta (1771-1851), French general and politician
Isidro de Laporta (1750-1808), Spanish composer and guitarist
Joe LaPorta (born 1980), American engineer
Joan Laporta (born 1962), Spanish politician and current president of FC Barcelona
John LaPorta (1920-2004), American jazz clarinettist
Matt LaPorta (born 1985), American former baseball player
Norberto La Porta (1938-2007), Argentine politician
Phil LaPorta (born 1952), former American footballer
Tina La Porta, American digital artist

See also
Laporte (disambiguation)

Italian toponymic surnames